An outdoor candle,  which is also known a pitch torch or a garden candle is a large (usually 10 cm wide) tealight-like candle that are lit outside. They are commonly found in Scandinavia, and are used as an outdoor decoration in private gardens, graves or at the side of roads or paths. They made from paraffin in a metal cup with thick centimetre wick, which heats up to 1000 °C.  Due to this heat, and the fact they are designed to be weatherproof, they have to be properly stuffed out with a snuffer.

See also 

 Tiki torch - another type of outdoor candle

References 

 
Garden ornaments